Johannes Groth (born 9 November 1988) is a Greenlandic former handballer for the Greenlandic national team and current coach of the Greenlandic women's national team.

Coaching
He began in 2011 with the women's team of the Grønlands Seminariums Sportklub. One year later he became assistant coach of Greenlandic women's national team and 2016 the head coach. In May 2021 he resigned from the coaching position shortly before the 2021 Nor.Ca. Women's Handball Championship.

References

1988 births
Living people
People from Sisimiut
Greenlandic male handball players
Greenlandic handball coaches
Handball coaches of international teams